Baptiste Valette (born 1 September 1992) is a French professional footballer who plays as goalkeeper for  club Cholet.

Club career
Valette signed with Nîmes Olympique after spells in the reserve sides of Montpellier HSC and Saint-Étienne, as well as R.E. Virton in the Belgian second division. Valette made his professional debut for Nîmes at the age of 25 in a 2–1 loss to Paris FC on 29 September 2017.

On 4 August 2022, Valette signed a one-year contract with Cholet in Championnat National.

International career
Valette represented the France national beach soccer team at the 2013 Euro Beach Soccer League. He made his first appearance in a match against the Switzerland national beach soccer team.

References

External links
 
 
 
 Dias Nîmes Profile
 Beach Soccer Profile

1992 births
People from Sète
Sportspeople from Hérault
Footballers from Occitania (administrative region)
Living people
French footballers
French beach soccer players
Association football goalkeepers
Montpellier HSC players
AS Saint-Étienne players
R.E. Virton players
Nîmes Olympique players
AS Nancy Lorraine players
SO Cholet players
Ligue 2 players
Challenger Pro League players
Belgian National Division 1 players
Championnat National players
Championnat National 2 players
Championnat National 3 players
French expatriate footballers
French expatriate sportspeople in Belgium
Expatriate footballers in Belgium